Cheval blanc or Cheval-Blanc, French for white horse, may refer to:

 Château Cheval Blanc, a wine producer in Saint-Émilion in the Bordeaux wine region of France
 Cheval-Blanc, a commune in the Vaucluse département of southern France
 Le Cheval Blanc, a brewpub in Montreal
 Le Cheval Blanc (mountain), in the Alps
Cheval Blanc, St Barths, a luxury hotel in St Barths

See also
 White Horse (disambiguation)